In Greek mythology, Amphimachus (Ancient Greek: Ἀμφίμαχος derived from ἀμφί amphi "on both sides, in all directions, surrounding" and μαχη mache "battle") son of Polyxenus and was also the king of Elis. He was named after Amphimachus, son of Cteatus. He was the father of Eleius, his successor.

Mythology

Pausanias' account 

 "Polyxenus came back safe from Troy and begat a son, Amphimachus. This name I think Polyxenus gave his son because of his friendship with Amphimachus, the son of Cteatus, who died at Troy. Amphimachus begat Eleius..."

Note

References 

 Pausanias, Description of Greece with an English Translation by W.H.S. Jones, Litt.D., and H.A. Ormerod, M.A., in 4 Volumes. Cambridge, MA, Harvard University Press; London, William Heinemann Ltd. 1918. . Online version at the Perseus Digital Library
Pausanias, Graeciae Descriptio. 3 vols. Leipzig, Teubner. 1903.  Greek text available at the Perseus Digital Library.

Kings of Elis
Kings in Greek mythology
Elean characters in Greek mythology